My Kinda Party is the fourth studio album released by American country music artist Jason Aldean. It was released on November 2, 2010 by Broken Bow Records. The songs were written by various songwriters including Neil Thrasher, Brantley Gilbert and Michael Dulaney.

Aldean said that he chose the name of the album because he thought it was representative of "what my fans have come to expect." He also said that it has a unique sound because he recorded it with his touring band and an engineer who does not work with any other artists.
On November 30, 2011, the album received a nomination for the 54th Grammy Awards for Best Country Album.

Content
The first single from My Kinda Party is the title track, which debuted on the Billboard Hot Country Songs chart at number 41. The song has become Aldean's tenth Top 10 hit on that chart, peaking at number two. The song also debuted at number 54 on the Hot 100 chart. "My Kinda Party" was written and originally recorded by country rock artist Brantley Gilbert for his 2009 album Modern Day Prodigal Son. Aldean's version was also certified Platinum by the Recording Industry Association of America (RIAA).

The second single "Don't You Wanna Stay", a duet with pop rock singer Kelly Clarkson, debuted on the country charts from unsolicited airplay at number 59 for the week of November 20, 2010. The song also debuted at number 93 on the Billboard Hot 100 chart. Aldean and Clarkson performed the song at the 44th Annual CMA Awards on November 10, 2010. "Don't You Wanna Stay" became Aldean's fifth number one hit on the Hot Country Songs chart, the week ending March 12, 2011. It was also his first release to AC and Hot AC radio, where it debuted at #15 on the Adult Contemporary chart and #39 on the Adult Top 40 chart. "Don't You Wanna Stay" was also certified Double Platinum by the RIAA.

The third single is the country rap-themed "Dirt Road Anthem", which was previously recorded separately by both of its writers, Brantley Gilbert and Colt Ford. It debuted as an album cut on the Hot Country Songs chart from unsolicited airplay at number 57 for the week ending February 5, 2011. According to AOL's The Boot, Aldean's publicist teased about this song, suggesting Aldean listened to "a little Snoop Dogg in his time"; regarding the song, Aldean said that he did not consider "Dirt Road Anthem" a rap song.
Aldean's version of "Dirt Road Anthem" was certified 4× Platinum by the RIAA. "Dirt Road Anthem" became Aldean's sixth number one hit on the country chart the week of July 30, 2011.

The fourth single from My Kinda Party is "Tattoos on This Town". It charted at number 18 on the Bubbling Under Hot 100 chart before it was released as a single. It was released as a single to country radio on September 5, 2011. It debuted on the Hot Country Songs chart at number 59 for the week ending August 27, 2011. On the week ending November 26, 2011, it peaked at number two for six weeks, making it his thirteenth top ten hit to date on this chart. Also, it debuted at number 81 on the Billboard Hot 100 on the week ending October 8, 2011 and has peaked at number 38, making it his fourth consecutive Top 40 hit on this chart. Most recently, it debuted at number 96 on the Canadian Hot 100 and has peaked at number 59. "Tattoos on This Town" has also been certified Platinum by the RIAA.

The album's fifth and final single is "Fly Over States", which was released as a single on February 6, 2012. It debuted at number 59 on Billboard'''s Hot Country Songs chart, and would go on to become Aldean's seventh number one hit on that chart.

Reception
Commercial
The album debuted at number two on the US Billboard 200, and number one on the Top Country Albums chart, selling 193,000 copies in its first week of release, giving him his best sales week and a new peak on the list. In its second week of release, the album dropped to number six on the Billboard 200, selling 81,000 copies. In February, the album topped the chart and stayed there for 12 non-consecutive weeks making it the first album by a male artist to do so since Kenny Chesney's When The Sun Goes Down, which stayed at number one for 14 weeks in 2004. In May 2011, it climbed back to No. 4 in its 29th charting week making it the highest chart position since its debut at No. 2. As of June 2014, the album has sold 3,130,000 copies in the US. It was certified quadruple Platinum by the RIAA on January 31, 2017 for 4 million units consumed.

Critical

Michael McCall with the Associated Press lauded Aldean for his "fresh sound" on the album, saying that he "stands at the forefront of a movement combining country themes with hard-rock chords". Calling it Aldean's "strongest album to date", Matt Bjorke with Roughstock gave it a four-star rating and said that Aldean "may just be one of country music’s best at making complete albums that are 'all killer, no filler'". Giving it a 3½ rating, Steve Leggett of Allmusic said that the album had "impressive sonic consistency" and "songs that fit his voice". Ken Tucker with Country Weekly gave the album a four-star rating, saying "Jason Aldean has grown from album to album, deftly improving on each previous project. His latest release continues the upward momentum".

Allison Stewart with The Washington Post gave the album a mixed review, saying "Party is likable but Nashville boilerplate; Every other track will sound familiar, even if it's the first time you've heard it". She described Aldean's cover of "Dirt Road Anthem" as "the high point" on the album, calling it a "boundary-stretching moment". Mario Tarradell with The Dallas Morning News'' gave it a C grade, referring to the material as "a vast array of standard, clichéd country-rock". He also said the track "Dirt Road Anthem" was the only song that "deserves another spin". Juli Thanki with Engine 145 gave the album 3½, saying it "includes some of his most enjoyable and mature work to date".

Track listing

Personnel

Technical
 Peter Coleman – engineer, mixing
 Mickey Jack Cones – vocal engineer
 Richard Dodd – mastering
 Brandon Epps – editing
 Shalacy Griffin – production assistant
 Michael Knox – production
 Sam Martin – assistant engineer
 James Minchin III – photography
 Glenn Sweitzer – art direction, design

Additional musicians
 Jason Aldean – lead vocals
 Kurt Allison – electric guitar
 Kelly Clarkson – vocals "Don't You Wanna Stay"
 Perry Coleman – background vocals
 Shalacy Griffin – background vocals
 Tony Harrell – Hammond B3, piano, strings, Wurlitzer
 Wes Hightower – background vocals
 Mike Johnson – pedal steel guitar, lap steel guitar
 Tully Kennedy – bass guitar
 Danny Rader – banjo, acoustic guitar
 Rich Redmond – drums, percussion
 Adam Shoenfeld – acoustic guitar, electric guitar
 Neil Thrasher – background vocals
 Lisa Torres – background vocals

Charts and certifications

Weekly charts

Year-end charts

Decade-end charts

Certifications

Singles

References

2010 albums
Jason Aldean albums
BBR Music Group albums
Albums produced by Michael Knox (record producer)